S-Bank Plc is the bank of the S-Group (Finnish: S-ryhmä), a Finnish retailing cooperative organisation.

S-Bank is the first so-called supermarket bank in Finland with 4872 employees. Changes in legislation about personal accounts at cooperatives made them uncompetitive, such that founding an entirely new bank was actually easier than keeping the personal accounts as cooperative funds. The cooperative did, and the bank continued to, offer a relatively high interest to deposited funds. It was 2.5% in February 2008, although this was cut to 0.2% due to the global recession since 2008. The existing network of supermarket service desks is used to service customers.

Fines 
In 2019, S-Bank was fined ca. €1m over lax monitoring of money laundering. No actual money laundering was found, but the problem was poor conformance to legal "know your customer" requirements.

References

External links

 S-Bank 
 S-Bank 

Banks of Finland
Supermarket banks
Banks established in 2006
Cooperative banking in Europe
Cooperatives in Finland
Finnish companies established in 2006